Laizé is a commune in the Saône-et-Loire department in the region of Bourgogne-Franche-Comté in eastern France.

Wine

Vineyards of Laizé are part of the appellation d'origine contrôlée Viré-Clessé, which is used for white wines from Chardonnay grapes.

See also
Communes of the Saône-et-Loire department

References

Communes of Saône-et-Loire